22 point regulation was a guideline approved by the Chinese Communist Party in 1988 to encourage Taiwanese investments in the People's Republic of China.

Focus
The law encouraged specifically land production and land development in Hainan Island, Guangdong, Fujian and other coastal provinces. It guaranteed Taiwan establishments would not be nationalized, and that exports were free from tariffs. Taiwanese management would be granted multiple visas.

See also
 Economy of China

References
 So, Alvin Y. Lin, Nan. Poston, Dudley L. Contributor Professor, So, Alvin Y. [2001] (2001). The Chinese Triangle of Mainland China, Taiwan and Hong Kong. Greenwood Publishing. 

Chinese economic policy
Regulation in China